Eddie Gibbs may refer to:
Eddie Gibbs (musician), American musician
Eddie Gibbs (politician), New York Assembly member